This is a list of films which have placed number one at the weekend box office in Canada during 2008.

Weekend gross list

Highest-grossing films in Canada

See also
List of Canadian films

References

External links

2008
Canada
2008 in Canadian cinema